Schizothorax yunnanensis is a species of ray-finned fish in the genus Schizothorax which is found in Yunnan.

References 

Schizothorax
Taxa named by John Roxborough Norman
Fish described in 1923